The following is a timeline of the history of the borough of Queens in New York City, New York, USA.

Prior to 20th century

 1657 - Flushing Remonstrance
 1683 - Queens County created.
 1790 - Population: 16,014.
 1821 - Horse racing track opens.
 1858 - First all-star baseball game and first games in which admission is charged takes place in Corona at the old Fashion Race Course.
 1860 - Population: 57,391.
 1870 - Population: 73,803.
 1880 - Population: 90,574.
 1889 - BMT Myrtle Avenue Line begins operating.
 1890 - Population: 128,059.
 1898 - January 1: Queens is established as a borough in the City of Greater New York. The borough consists of only part of the previous boundaries of Queens County; Nassau County is established in the remaining part.

20th century

1900s-1940s
 1900
 King Manor Museum founded in Jamaica.
 Population: 152,999.
 1909 - Queensboro Bridge opens.
 1910
 East River Tunnels open.
 Population: 284,041.
 1911 - Queens Chamber of Commerce established.
 1912 - Chapin Home for the Aging active.
 1914 - Murray Hill Theatre opens in Flushing.
 1915 - US Open tennis tournament relocates to Queens.
 1916 - Queensboro Plaza (New York City Subway) opens.
 1920 - Population: 469,042.
 1928 - The 7 Train reaches Flushing
 1930
 King Kullen grocery supermarket in business.
 Population: 1,079,129.
 1933 - IND Crosstown Line begins operating.
 1936 - Triborough Bridge built.
 1939
 April 30: 1939 New York World's Fair opens.
 Bronx–Whitestone Bridge built.
 1940
 Queens–Midtown Tunnel opens.
 Beacon Theater opens in Long Island City.
 Population: 1,297,634.
 1941 - Strand Theatre opens in Astoria.

1950s-1990s
 1950 - Population: 1,550,849.
 1953 - Queens Symphony Orchestra formed.
 1960 - Population: 1,809,578.
 1963 
 The revised (1963) New York City Charter creates community boards within each borough.
 Weight Watchers founded.
 1964 
 Shea Stadium opens, bringing Major League Baseball and the National Football League to Queens with the New York Mets and the New York Jets. 
 April 22: 1964 New York World's Fair opens.
 1968 - Queens Historical Society founded.
 1969 - Mets win the World Series for the first time.
 1971 - Queens Tribune newspaper in publication.
 1976 
 Afrikan Poetry Theatre founded.
 Son of Sam serial killings take place over a year in Flushing, Bellerose, and Forest Hills.
 1983
 Silvercup Studios in business.
 Gary Ackerman becomes U.S. representative for New York's 7th congressional district.
 1985 - Greater Astoria Historical Society founded.
 1986 - Mets win their second World Series.
 1990
 Citicorp Building constructed, at the time the tallest building between Manhattan and Boston.
 Population: 1,951,598.
 1993 - New York Hospital Queens active.
 1996 - Energy Brands, maker of Vitamin Water, established in Whitestone.
 1997 - Arthur Ashe Stadium opens, home to the US Open tennis tournament.
 1998 - Gregory Meeks becomes U.S. representative for New York's 6th congressional district.

21st century

2000s - 2010s
 2000 - Population: 2,229,379.
 2001
 November 12: Airplane crash occurs.
 Astoria Performing Arts Center established.
 2007 - Newtown Historical Society formed.
 2010
 March 10: José Peralta, of Jackson Heights became the first Dominican-American to be elected to the New York State Senate.
 Queens Memory Project begins.
 Population: 2,230,722 in Queens.
 2013 
 Grace Meng becomes U.S. representative for New York's 6th congressional district.
 The graffiti wall 5 Pointz in Long Island City falls prey to redevelopment and is torn down without any opportunity to preserve the artwork.
 2014
 October 23: 2014 Queens hatchet attack.
 Melinda Katz becomes borough president.
 2017
 January 20: Queens born Donald Trump becomes the 45th President of the United States
 2019
 February 14: After being awarded one of the two new headquarter locations for Amazon, the company announced it was withdrawing its plans to establish a presence in Long Island City, and with this withdrawal the prospect of 25,000 new jobs.

2020s

 2020
 December 14: Sandra Lindsay, a Registered Nurse at Long Island Jewish Medical Center, became the first recipient of the first dosage of the then only  Emergency Use Authorization (EUA) approved COVID-19 vaccine - the Pfizer–BioNTech COVID-19 vaccine.
 2021
 January 4: Nurse Sandra Lindsay, received her second and final dosage of a EUA approved COVID-19 vaccine. With the second dosage, she is expected to have a 95% immunity to COVID-19.
 February 10: Citi Field is converted into a COVID-19 vaccination "mega-site" operated by the City of New York.

See also
 Queens directories
 Queens history
 National Register of Historic Places in Queens County, New York
 List of New York City Designated Landmarks in Queens
 List of streetcar lines in Queens
 List of New York City Subway stations in Queens
 List of Queens borough presidents
 List of Queens neighborhoods
 Neighborhood histories: Astoria, Bayside, College Point, Corona, Douglaston, Elmhurst, Flushing, Glendale, Jamaica, Long Island City, Maspeth, Ridgewood, Rockaway, Whitestone, Woodhaven, Woodside, etc.

other NYC boroughs
 Timeline of Brooklyn
 Timeline of the Bronx
 Timeline of Staten Island
 Timeline of New York City - a timeline inclusive of both Greater New York City and Manhattan history.

References

Bibliography

published in the 19th century
 
 
  + Register

published in the 20th century
 
 Mary A. Glascock. An Annotated Bibliography of the History of Queens County, New York (Queens College, 1977) 218 pages
 Janet E. Lieberman and Richard K. Lieberman. City Limits: A Social History of Queens (Kendall/Hunt Publishing Company, 1983)
 

published in the 21st century
 
  (includes "History" section)

External links

 
 
 
  (timeline)
 

 
Queens
Queens, New York-related lists
Years in New York (state)
queens
Queens